DJ Baby Anne (born Marianne Breslin; November 17, 1972) is an Orlando-based DJ who works with live sets and original mixes that fuse electro with Miami bass and funky breaks.

Chart hits
The single "Probe" reached No. 5 on the Billboard Hot Dance Maxi-Singles Sales chart in 2002.

The album Mixtress reached No. 12 on the Billboard Top Electronic Albums chart in 2004.

Discography

 Bass Queen: In the Mix, Volume 1 - A Bass and Breaks Continuous Mix (1999)
 Bass Queen: In the Mix, Volume 2 (2000)
 Dark Side of the Boom (2001)
 I'm About to Break (2002)
 Mixed Live at Club Ra in Las Vegas (2003)
 Mixtress (2004)
 Assault and Battery EP (with Jen Lasher) (2005)
 Baby Anne Rocks! (2006)
 Past, Present, Future (2007)
 Ground N' Pound (2008)
 I Heart Bass (2009)
 Babylicious (2010)
 Bottom Heavy (2011)
 Bad Baby (2012)
 Beauty of the Beats (2013)
 Disturbing the Beats (2014)
 Full Circle (2015)
 Bass Switch (2018)

References

1972 births
American women DJs
American electronic musicians
American trance musicians
Club DJs
Living people
Musicians from Orlando, Florida
American electronic dance music DJs
21st-century American women musicians